Harford County Public Library is a public library serving Harford County, Maryland. It has 11 branches (plus one in design phase) and an administration and support services building. The library has an annual circulation of over 4 million materials and serves more than 174,000 registered borrowers.

History

In June 1945, Harford County became the first county in Maryland to implement the new tax-supported Public Library Law. By January 1946, the first Harford County Board of Library Trustees was formed and the old Methodist Church Building on Main Street in Bel Air was bought to provide headquarters for the County library system. At this time work is being done to build a new Library facility in the City of Havre de Grace.

The Harford County Public Library borrower's card is free and available to a person of any age. Included in the services and materials that the library offers to the community are: books, eBooks, sound recordings, audio books, eAudiobooks, Playaways, magazines, newspapers, video games, public meeting rooms, large-type books, DVDs, compact discs, STEM kits, puzzles, puppets, oral history, films, copy machines, public access computer catalogs with printers, microfilm reader- printer, children and adult programs, information services, Internet access, health information, tax assistance, and volunteer opportunities.

For this past fiscal year, HCPL reached the circulation of 4.1 million library items.

Branches
The library has eleven service outlets, listed here by collection size.

Bel Air
Bel Air Branch Library (Bel Air, Harford County, Maryland) has been the largest branch in the system since its beginning in 1947. The building was constructed in 1960 and renovated and expanded in 1967. A second renovation and expansion occurred in 1998. The Children's Section was renovated in 2016. The Learning and Sharing Center collection is housed in Bel Air Branch. .
Location: 	100 E. Pennsylvania Avenue, Bel Air, MD 21014
 Size:  	.
 Collection:  	255,277   as of 7/2008
 Circulation  	FY 07 - 1,028,419 
Meeting Room:  	. (3 rooms at )

Abingdon
Abingdon Branch Library (Abingdon, Maryland) opened May 17, 2004.
 Location:  	2510 S. Tollgate Road, Bel Air, MD 21015
 Size:  	.
 Collection:  	173,822    as of 7/2008
 Circulation:  	FY07 - 879,818
Meeting Room: 	1058 sq ft (2 rooms )

Aberdeen
Aberdeen Branch Library (Aberdeen, Maryland) opened in its present location in 1974.
 Location:  	21 Franklin Street, Aberdeen, MD 21001
 Size:  	.
 Collection:  	96,300   as of 7/2008
 Circulation:  	FY 07 - 320,124 
Meeting Room: 	.

Edgewood
Edgewood Branch Library (Edgewood, Maryland) opened in 1962 and was renovated and expanded in 1979. A second renovation and expansion occurred in 2001.
Location:	629 Edgewood Road, Edgewood, MD 21040
Size: 	        .
Collection: 	92,168   as of 7/2008
Circulation: 	FY 07 - 248,445
Meeting Room: 	. (2 rooms )

Fallston
Fallston Branch Library (Fallston, Maryland) opened in December 1984 as the Fallston/Jarrettsville Branch, now serving primarily the Fallston area. 
 Location:  	1461 Fallston Road, Fallston, MD 21047
Size: 	
Collection: 	92,608   as of 7/2008
Circulation: 	FY 07 - 308,628
Meeting Room: 	.

Joppa
Joppa Branch Library (Joppa, Maryland) opened in 1980.
Location: 	655 Towne Center Drive, Joppa, MD 21085
Size: 	        .
Collection: 	74,931   as of 7/2008
Circulation: 	FY 07 - 202,028 
Meeting Room: 	.

Havre de Grace
Havre de Grace Branch Library (Havre de Grace, Maryland) opened in its present location in 1987 and was rebuilt in 2015.
Location: 	120 N. Union Avenue, Havre de Grace, MD 21078
Size:	        .
Collection: 	62,952   as of 7/2008
Circulation: 	FY 07 - 220,867
Meeting Room: 	.

Whiteford
Whiteford Branch Library (Whiteford, Maryland) opened on June 23, 1992 was renovated and expanded in 2010. 
Location: 	2407 Whiteford Road, MD 21160
Size:	        .
Collections: 	56,685    as of 7/2008
Circulation: 	FY 07 - 208,362 
Meeting Room: 	.

Jarrettsville
Jarrettsville Branch Library (Jarrettsville, Maryland) opened May 1, 2006.
Location: 	3722 Norrisville Road, Jarrettsivlle, MD 21084
Size: 	        .
Collection: 	67,992     as of 7/2008
Circulation: 	FY07 - 282,345
Meeting Room: 	.

Norrisville
Norrisville Branch Library (Norrisville, Maryland) opened at its present location on February 1, 2003.
Location: 	5310 Norrisville Road, White Hall, MD 21161
Size: 	        .
Collection: 	35,619    as of 7/2008
Circulation: 	FY 07 - 104,856
Meeting Room: 	. shared with Parks and Recreation

Darlington
Darlington Branch Library (Darlington, Maryland) moved to its present location in 1979. A new location is under construction. 
Location: 	1134 Main Street, Darlington, MD 21034
Size: 	        .
Collection: 	17,741    as of 7/2008
Circulation: 	FY 07 - 51,500 
Meeting Room: 	none

Other services

Rolling Reader

The Rolling Reader is one of many outreach services the Library provides to Harford County residents. The Rolling Reader promotes reading for pleasure, visiting after school programs that target at-risk children in grades K through 8.
Service Began: January 2001
FY07 Circulation: 4,075
Collection Size: 9,688  as of 7/2008

Silver Reader

The Silver Reader, a mobile library vehicle, will begin visiting Senior Centers, Senior Housing, Assisted Living Facilities and Nursing Homes throughout the county later this spring.
The vehicle is equipped with a lift so customers in wheelchairs will be able to board the vehicle and choose materials for themselves, with help from library staff if they like. At facilities where some customers may need more assistance, the Silver Reader staff can take materials inside for customers to review and check out.
Service Began: March 2006
Annual Circulation - 6,365 
Collection Size: 4,695    as of 7/2008

Harford County Detention Center
FY07 Circulation: 18,825

External links

Harford County Public Library

Public libraries in Maryland
Buildings and structures in Harford County, Maryland
Education in Harford County, Maryland
Libraries established in 1946
1946 establishments in Maryland